Trompowsky may refer to:

People 
 Edmund von Trompowsky (1851–1919), Baltic German architect
 Octávio Trompowsky (1897–1984), Brazilian chess player

Other uses 
 Trompowsky Attack, a chess opening